Gérard Onesta (born 5 August 1960) is a French politician and was Member of the European Parliament for the South West of France.

He is a member of Europe Écologie–The Greens, part of the European Greens. On 20 July 2004 he was re-elected a Member of the European Parliament, and he was elected four times one of its Vice-Presidents. His successor is José Bové.

In March 2010 regional election, he is the leader of Europe Écologie–The Greens in Midi-Pyrénées.

Onesta defines himself as a European federalist, with strong proclivities for regionalism.

Trivia 

His cousin Claude Onesta is the coach of the 5 fold champion France men's national handball team.

External links

Gérard Onesta official website
European Parliament: Gérard Onesta

1960 births
Living people
People from Albi
MEPs for South-West France 2004–2009
The Greens (France) MEPs
MEPs for France 1999–2004
Europe Ecology – The Greens politicians
French people of Italian descent
Politicians from Occitania (administrative region)